Sylvia Cassedy (January 29, 1930 – April 6, 1989) was an American novelist and poet, who is best known for her children's and young adult fiction.

Life
Cassedy was born January 29, 1930, in Brooklyn, New York.  She graduated from Brooklyn College, and worked as a primary and secondary school teacher.

Cassedy is known for her young adult novels.  Her three novels Behind the Attic Wall, M.E. and Morton, and Lucie Babbidge's House feature preadolescent girls as protagonists, who use fantasy and play to improve their circumstances.

Besides her young adult novels, Cassedy wrote two volumes of poetry.  She translated collections of poems from India and from Japan.  Based on her teaching experience, she wrote a guide to creative writing In Your Own Words: a Beginner's Guide to Writing.

Cassedy died April 6, 1989, in Manhasset, NY.  Her collected papers are held by the University of Minnesota.

Awards
Cassedy's book Lucie Babbidge's House was named an honor book (runner-up) for the Phoenix Award of the Children's Literature Association in 2009.

Selected works

Children's and young adult fiction
 Behind the Attic Wall (HarperCollins, 1985). 
 M.E. and Morton (HarperCollins, 1987). 
 Lucie Babbidge's House (HarperCollins, 1989).  
 The Best Cat Suit of All (Dial Books, 1991).  Illustrated by Rosekrans Hoffman.

Instructional
 In Your Own Words: A Beginner's Guide to Writing (Doubleday, 1979).

Poetry
 Roomrimes: Poems (Crowell, 1987).  Illustrated by Michele Chessare. 
 Zoomrimes: Poems about Things that Go (HarperCollins, 1993).  Illustrated by Michele Chessare.

Translation
 Red Dragonfly on my Shoulder, with Kunihiro Suetake (HarperCollins, 1992).  Illustrated by Molly Bang.  Revised and retitled from Birds, Frogs, and Moonlight by the same authors (Doubleday, 1967).  Illustrated by Vo-Dinh.
 Moon-Uncle, Moon-Uncle, with Parvathi Thampi (Doubleday, 1972).  Illustrated by Susanne Suba.

References

1930 births
1989 deaths
American women children's writers
American children's writers
20th-century American women writers
20th-century American writers
People from Brooklyn
Brooklyn College alumni